William Whitaker  (born 26 July 1989) is an English show jumper from Yorkshire. Whitaker has represented Britain at show jumping.
Whitaker is from a dynasty of show jumpers and horse trainers including his uncles Michael and John Whitaker.

In 2016 William Whitaker became the third member of his family, after uncles John and Michael, to win the British Jumping Derby at All England Jumping Course at Hickstead, having finished third and second in the previous years events.
On 22 December 2018 Whitaker won the FEI Jumping World Cup at the Horse of the Year Show. Riding Utamaro D Ecaussines, the pair finished first after jumping a fast clear round in an eighteen strong jump off.

References

1989 births
Living people
Sportspeople from Yorkshire
British show jumping riders